TSG Weinheim is a German association football club from the city of Weinheim, Baden-Württemberg. The origins of the club go back to the founding on 20 August 1862 of the gymnastics club Turnverein Weinheim.



History
In 1878 the club split into two branches with the formation of TV II Weinheim. The breakaway club took on the name Turngenossenschaft Weinheim in 1883 before becoming Turngenossenschaft Jahn 1878 Weinheim in 1907. On 29 June 1946, parent club TV Weinheim was reunited with TGS Jahn Weinheim and was also joined by DJK Schwarz-Weiß 1923 Weinheim to form TSG 1862 Weinheim.

Throughout its early history the Weinheim club remained an anonymous side in lower tier local competition. Following a 1994 Landesliga Nordbaden (V) title win TSG broke through to the Amateurliga Nordbaden (IV) where they played as a middling side over the next four seasons.

In 1990, the club formed an American Football department, the Weinheim Longhorns.

In 1998 another local club, FV Weinheim, failed financially and its football department subsequently became part of TSG. The new team took to the field under the name TSG Weinheim 62/09 and advanced to play in the Oberliga Baden-Württemberg (IV) in 1999. They were sent down after a 15th-place result, and over the next four seasons repeated the cycle of promotion followed by immediate relegation. Between 2004–09 the team played as part of the Verbandsliga Nordbaden and returned to the now fifth tier Oberliga Baden-Württemberg in 2009. The club was relegated from the Oberliga again in 2011.

Since then the club took part in the promotion round to the Oberliga twice after finishing runner-up in the Verbandsliga, in 2012 and 2016, but on both occasions was unsuccessful.

Honours
 Verbandsliga Nordbaden
 Champions: 1999, 2001, 2003, 2009

Recent managers
Recent managers of the club:

Recent seasons
The recent season-by-season performance of the club:

 With the introduction of the Regionalligas in 1994 and the 3. Liga in 2008 as the new third tier, below the 2. Bundesliga, all leagues below dropped one tier.

References

External links 
Official team site
Das deutsche Fußball-Archiv historical German domestic league tables 
TSG Weinheim profile at Weltfussball.de

Football clubs in Germany
Football clubs in Baden-Württemberg
Association football clubs established in 1862
1862 establishments in Baden
Athletics clubs in Germany